Laurids Nilsen (Norwegian), Lars Nilsson (Swedish) or Laurentius Nicolai Norvegus (Latin), known in Sweden as Kloster-Lasse or Convent-Lawrence (1538, Tønsberg, Denmark–Norway – 1622, Vilnius, Lithuania), was a Norwegian Jesuit, active in service of the Counter-Reformation in Sweden during the reign of King John III of Sweden from 1576 until 1588. During that time, he headed the Roman Catholic  Collegium Regium Stockholmense.

References
 Oskar Garstein: Klosterlasse: Stormfuglen som ville gjenerobre Norden for katolisismen, i serien Torleif Dahls Kulturbibliotek, Oslo:Aschehoug. 1998 
 Vello Helk: Laurentius Nicolai Norvegus S.J.: en biografi med bidrag til belysning af romerkirkens forsøg på at genvinde Danmark-Norge i tiden fra reformationen til 1622. 1966
 Bra Böckers lexikon, 1977
 [a b] Carlquist, Gunnar, red (1933). Svensk uppslagsbok. Bd 16. Malmö: Svensk Uppslagsbok AB. Sid. 1043
 Westerlund, Harriet: Klosterlasses mission i Sverige i Signum nr 3, 2002

1538 births
1622 deaths
16th-century Jesuits
16th-century Norwegian clergy
16th-century Swedish people
Norwegian Jesuits
Counter-Reformation